The Royal Aircraft Factory B.E.8 was a British two-seat single-engined general purpose biplane of the First World War, designed by John Kenworthy at the Royal Aircraft Factory in 1913. Small numbers were used by the Royal Flying Corps over the Western Front in the first year of the war, with the type being used as a trainer until 1916.

Development and design
The B.E.8 was the definitive development of the earlier B.E 3 type, and the last of the B.E. series to be designed with a rotary engine. The main changes were that the fuselage now rested on the lower wing, in the normal way for a tractor biplane, and that the tail unit was changed to the B.E.2 pattern. Three prototypes were built at Farnborough with a single long cockpit for both crew members. The production aircraft had two separate cockpits and were built by sub-contractors. The improved B.E.8a of 1915 had new B.E.2c type wings, featuring ailerons instead of wing warping and a revised tail unit.

Operational history
Both models of the aircraft entered service with the Royal Flying Corps and a small number served in France in 1914 and early 1915 but most were used by training units.

Variants
BE.8
Production aircraft with wing warping.
BE.8a
Production aircraft with ailerons.

Operators

Royal Flying Corps
No. 1 Squadron RFC
No. 2 Squadron RFC
No. 3 Squadron RFC
No. 5 Squadron RFC
No. 6 Squadron RFC
No. 9 Squadron RFC

Specifications (BE.8)

See also

References

Citations

Bibliography
 Angelucci, Enzo. The Rand McNally Encyclopedia of Military Aircraft, 1914-1980. San Diego, California: The Military Press, 1983. .
 Bruce, J.M. British Aeroplanes 1914-18. London: Putnam, 1957.
 Bruce, J.M. The Aircraft of the Royal Flying Corps (Military Wing) . London: Putnam, 1982. .
 Hare, Paul R. The Royal Aircraft Factory. London:Putnam, 1990. .
The Illustrated Encyclopedia of Aircraft (Part Work 1982-1985). London: Orbis Publishing, 1985, p. 2819.

1910s British military reconnaissance aircraft
BE08
Biplanes
Single-engined tractor aircraft
Aircraft first flown in 1913
Rotary-engined aircraft